Hakgala Botanical Garden is one of the five botanical gardens in Sri Lanka. The other four are Peradeniya Botanical Garden, Henarathgoda Botanical Garden, Mirijjawila Botanical Garden and Seetawaka Botanical Garden. It is the second largest botanical garden in Sri Lanka. The garden is contiguous to Hakgala Strict Nature Reserve.

Location and climate
Hakgala Botanical Garden is situated on the Nuwara Eliya-Badulla main road, 16 km from Nuwara Eliya. The garden has a cool temperate climate because of altitude is 5,400 feet above sea level. The mean annual temperature ranges between 16 °C to 30 °C during the course of a year. From December to February it has a cold climate, while the warm climate persists from April to August.

History
The garden was established in 1861, under George Henry Kendrick Thwaites as an experimental cultivation of Cinchona, a commercial crop thriving at the time. Once after the Tea replaced the Cinchona, it was turned into an experimental Tea cultivation. In 1884 it transformed into a garden. Since then many subtropical and some temperate plants were planted in the gardens.

Folklore
In the folklores, it says Sri Lankan demon King Ravana after abducting Sita, kept her hidden in this area and area was offered to Sita as a pleasure garden, the place finds mention in the Ramayana as Ashok Vatika. The area was named as "Sita Eliya" and "Sita Amman Temple" was built on the site.

Visitor attraction
There are over 10,000 species of flora planted here and during the Spring season in Nuwara Eliya thousands of visitors come to see the blooms here. The number of annual visitors is around 500,000. The garden is famous for number of species of Orchids and Roses are planted there.

Notes

References

 

Nuwara Eliya District
Botanical gardens in Sri Lanka
1861 establishments in Ceylon